Big John Hamilton (October 29, 1916 -  December 5, 1984) was an American restaurateur and actor known for various small roles in American films, especially western films.  He had roles in several John Wayne films.

Hamilton, who was born in Asheville, North Carolina, was 6-ft 4-in tall and owned a steak house in San Antonio where he met Wayne and was offered a small, uncredited role in The Alamo.  He continued to have roles in other Wayne films and a few other films and guest appearances on several television series.

He died of an apparent heart attack at Brooke Army Medical Center in San Antonio on December 5, 1984.

Filmography

References

External links

1916 births
1984 deaths
Male actors from North Carolina
American male film actors
20th-century American male actors
Male actors from San Antonio